José Carlos Pinto Samayoa (born 16 June 1993) is a Guatemalan professional footballer who plays as a defender for Liga Nacional club Comunicaciones and the Guatemala national team.

Career
Pinto began his senior career with Malacateco, before moving to Municipal in 2013. In 2015, he transferred to Antigua where he made over 200 appearances for the club, and help them win 4 Liga Nacional de Fútbol de Guatemala in 5 years. On 8 June 2020, he transferred to Comunicaciones.

On 9 January 2022 of Paraguay's summer transfer window, Pinto officially completed a transfer to Tacuary Asunción.

On 1 July 2022, he rejoined Comunicaciones on a free transfer.

International career
Pinto made his international debut for the Guatemala national team in a friendly 7–1 loss to Armenia on 28 May 2016.

Personal life
Pinto's uncle, Manuel Vásquez, was also a professional footballer in Guatemala.

Honours
Antigua 
Liga Nacional de Guatemala: Apertura 2015, Apertura 2016, Apertura 2017, Clausura 2019

Comunicaciones
CONCACAF League: 2021

References

External links
 
 

1993 births
Living people
People from Jalapa Department
Guatemalan footballers
Guatemala international footballers
Guatemala youth international footballers
Association football defenders
Liga Nacional de Fútbol de Guatemala players
C.S.D. Municipal players
Antigua GFC players
Comunicaciones F.C. players
2021 CONCACAF Gold Cup players